MV Mont St Michel is a ferry operated by Brittany Ferries. She was built at Van der Giessen de Noord shipyard in the Netherlands and has been sailing for Brittany Ferries since 2002. Mont St Michel was to have been called Deauville or Honfleur but this was thought to be too similar to Barfleur. Early artist impressions of the ship carried the name Normandie 2.  The internal layout of Mont St Michel is based on the MV Normandie, which also operates on the Portsmouth–Caen (Ouistreham) route.

Construction started on 7 June 2001 and she was launched on 15 March 2002. Major delays in fitting out meant that the ship was not delivered until December 2002, over 5 months behind schedule. In place of Mont St Michel, the smaller Quiberon was kept in the fleet throughout the busy 2002 summer season, assisted by Purbeck.

Mont St Michel sails under the French flag and is registered in Caen.

Routes served 
Portsmouth–Caen (Ouistreham) 2002–present

External links 
 Official Brittany Ferries Website
 about MV Mount St. Michel Official Brittany Ferries Website

Ferries of the United Kingdom
Ferries of France
Cruiseferries
2002 ships
Ships built in the Netherlands